The Suzuki FXR150 is a sport bike made in Malaysia by Lion Suzuki Motor. It is powered by a four-valve, DOHC four-stroke  single-cylinder engine. Lion Suzuki Motor produces the motorcycle with 75% local content. It replaced the slightly larger in size two-stroke Suzuki RG150/RGV150. It features a full digital dash which displayed fuel, rpm, speed and gear. The frame is made of box cut steel and had a banana-shaped rear swingarm. It has a single mono shock on the rear with a single disc brake. The front suspension is a traditional telescopic fork also with a single disc brake. The wheels are five-spoke Enkei mag type wheels. The engine has a six-speed close-ratio gearbox with both kick-start and electric start systems. The engine features a small oil cooler to aid cooling (the Suzuki advanced cooling system). It also features the TWIRL system at the combustion chamber.

FXR150
Sport bikes